Wayne Hunter (born July 2, 1981) is a former American football offensive tackle. Drafted by the Seattle Seahawks in the third round of the 2003 NFL Draft, he played college football at Hawaii after transferring from Cal.

Hunter has also played for the Jacksonville Jaguars, New York Jets, and St. Louis Rams.

Early years
Hunter attended Radford High School in Honolulu, Hawai'i.

College career
Hunter began his college career playing at California. He later transferred to Hawaii.

Professional career

Seattle Seahawks
Hunter was drafted 73rd overall in 2003. He played three seasons with the Seahawks.

Jacksonville Jaguars
Hunter played one season with the Jacksonville Jaguars in 2006.

New York Jets
On March 23, 2010, Hunter signed a 1-year tender with the Jets worth about $1.2 million. Hunter came to an agreement on a four-year $15 million contract extension on July 26, 2011 with the team, replacing Damien Woody. During the 2011 season finale against the Miami Dolphins, Hunter was involved about an argument with Santonio Holmes while the team was huddling. Holmes was benched for the game after the argument and the Jets would eventually lose the game plus miss the postseason for the first time in 3 years.

On August 23, 2012, head coach Rex Ryan made the decision to bench Hunter for allowing too many sacks. Austin Howard replaced Hunter at that time.

St. Louis Rams
On August 27, 2012, the Jets traded Hunter to the St. Louis Rams for right tackle Jason Smith.

On March 6, 2013, Hunter was released.

Buffalo Bills
On July 1, 2015, Hunter signed with the Buffalo Bills. Hunter was later released on July 21, 2015.

References

External links
New York Jets bio

1981 births
Living people
African-American players of American football
American football defensive tackles
American football offensive tackles
California Golden Bears football players
Hawaii Rainbow Warriors football players
Seattle Seahawks players
Jacksonville Jaguars players
New York Jets players
St. Louis Rams players
Buffalo Bills players
Players of American football from Honolulu
American sportspeople of Samoan descent
Admiral Arthur W. Radford High School alumni
21st-century African-American sportspeople
20th-century African-American people